Zophos is a genus of air-breathing land snails, terrestrial pulmonate gastropod mollusks in the family Haplotrematidae.

Species 
Species within the genus Zophos include:
 Zophos baudoni (Petit, 1853)
 Zophos concolor Férussac

References

External links 

Haplotrematidae